The 2010–11 Evansville IceMen season was the first season in the Central Hockey League of the CHL franchise in Evansville, Indiana.

Off-season
During the off-season it was announced that the Evansville IceMen was to participate in the Central Hockey League for the upcoming season.

Regular season

Conference standings

Awards and records

Awards

Milestones

Transactions
The IceMen have been involved in the following transactions during the 2010–11 season.

Roster
Updated March 17, 2011.

See also
 2010–11 CHL season

References

External links
 2010–11 Evansville IceMen season at Pointstreak

E
E